Several ships of the Chilean Navy have been named Esmeralda

 , a Spanish frigate that Chile captured in 1820 and renamed Valdivia; she was wrecked in 1825
 , a wooden steam corvette sunk during the War of the Pacific
 , the world's first protected cruiser; purchased by Japan in 1894 and renamed Izumi
 , an armored cruiser 
 , ex-HMCS Glace Bay (K414)
 , a training ship of the Chilean Navy, launched in 1953

Esmeralda, Chilean ship